Hanstholm fortress (German: Festung Hanstholm; Danish: Hanstholm batteri) was a large coastal fortification, built by Nazi Germany at Hanstholm in north-western Denmark during World War II. The remains of the fortress is now a World War II museum situated in Thy National Park.

History 
Hanstholm Fortress was part of the "Atlantic Wall" and its main purpose was to seal off the entrance to Skagerrak together with the Vara fortress in Kristiansand,  southern Norway, and extensive minefields in Skagerrak. The fortress had a wide range of artillery, from medium-sized 17 cm SK L/40 guns up to four 38 cm S.K.C/34 guns, weighing 110 tons each (the whole gun position weighing 650 tonnes). However, after Gneisenau was damaged in a bomb raid, a decision was made not to fit the guns to the ship, but to use them instead in fortresses. The guns could fire a  projectile , or an  shell . The rate of fire was 1 shot per 1.5 minutes. The fortress was defended by German Naval Artillery Battalion 118.

Post war
The 38 cm guns were scrapped in 1951–52. Today, the remains of the fortress is a museum.

German units at Hanstholm fortress

Gallery

See also 

 Battery Todt
 Kristiansand Cannon Museum

References

External links 

 Museumscenter Hanstholm

Atlantic Wall
World War II sites in Denmark
Forts in Denmark
Coastal fortifications
Museums in the North Jutland Region
Military and war museums in Denmark
World War II museums